Andriy Naumov or Andrii Naumov (born 21 December 1973) is a Ukrainian athlete who specialises in long distance running, principally the marathon.

He competed in the marathon final at the 2001 World Championships in Athletics and finished in 50th place. He was twice the winner of the Munich Marathon, taking the title in a time of 2:13:57 (in 2001) and in 2:18:23 (in 2010).

He won the Ljubljana Marathon two years running in 2002 and 2003, and also won the Moscow International Peace Marathon twice in 2005 and 2006. Naumov finished second in the 2006 Istanbul Marathon, just seconds behind winner Mindaugas Pukštas. In 2008 he won the Dublin Marathon in a personal best time of 2:11:06. He returned to defend his title the following year but only managed to finish in eighth position.

In 2011, he ran at the Athens Classic Marathon and came fourth overall.

Achievements
All results regarding marathon, unless stated otherwise

References

External links

marathoninfo

1973 births
Living people
Ukrainian male long-distance runners
Ukrainian male marathon runners